Gardenia gordonii is a species of plant in the family Rubiaceae endemic to Fiji.  The native gardenias of Fiji possess a diverse array of natural products.  Methoxylated and oxygenated flavonols and triterpenes accumulate on the vegetative- and floral-buds as droplets of secreted resin.  Phytochemical studies of these bud exudates have been published, including a population-level study of two other rare, sympatric species on Vanua Levu Island of the Fiji Archipelago, G. candida and G. grievei.

References

Endemic flora of Fiji
gordonii
Near threatened plants
Taxonomy articles created by Polbot